Kailasa is an Indian fusion band, founded by Kailash Kher. The name of the band is taken from an accented pronunciation of Kailash's own name as well as Mount Kailash, the abode of Hindu God Shiva. Along with guitars, drums and keyboards, the band incorporates classical Indian instruments and sometimes traditional lyrics into their songs to infuse folk and a Sufi hue.

Band members
 Kailash Kher — Lead Vocals
 Paresh Kamath — Lead guitar, Keyboards, Backing Vocals
 Naresh Kamath — Bass guitar, Keyboards, Backing Vocals
 Kurt Peters — Drums
 Sanket sane  — Indian & Western Percussions, Backing Vocals
 Jose Neil Gomes – Saxophone, Violin, Acoustic Guitar, Flute
 Sameer Chiplunkar – Keyboard
 Jovian Soans – Audio Engineer
 Tapas Roy – Mandolin, Dulcimer

Musical style
Kailasa's music is a blend of medieval Indian music, Sufi and Western music. Lyrical themes though vary but the most distinct style of Kailash Kher is where he sings as through a female devotee/lover trying to persuade her deity/loved one. Fusion of love, worship and persuasion is inspired by the works of medieval Rajasthani poet Meerabai. Such an influence can be observed in songs 'Teri Deewani' and 'Albela Saajan' from their eponymous debut album. Similar theme can be found in another of their song 'Babam Bam' from the album 'Jhoomo Re' where the singer is persuading Lord Shiva.

Due to the complex nature of musical arrangement in their songs, Kailasa involve artists other than band members in the recording process to play instruments like Harmonium, Dholak, Tabla Sarangi, Iranian Setar, Ravanahatta, Rabab, Saz, Oud, Mandolin, Santoor, Sitar, Mor Chang, Khartal etc. The artists are credited for their work in each of their album.

Performances
The band has performed in more than 100 cities worldwide including Delhi, Mumbai, Ahmedabad,  Singapore, Malaysia, Houston, San Francisco and New York. Kailasa also performed at the annual festival of maharishi markandeshwar university, mullana (ambala), Amity University at Noida on 18 February 2011 and at the Manipal Institute Of Technology (KMC Greens), Manipal, Karnataka, on 27 March 2012. Recently Kailasa performed at Indian Institute of Information Technology, Allahabad in December 2011 and at the Birla Institute of Technology, Mesra, Ranchi on the 17th of Match 2013. They performed in the Techno-Management symposium of Nirma University of Science and Technology during February 2013. The band also performed on 28 March 2013 in the annual college festival of Rajiv Gandhi Institute of Technology- Zodiac. They also performed at Guru Nanak Khalsa College, Matunga on 7 August 2013 as a part of the 'What's your Kathagaan?' contest, announcing the winners at the event. Also on 10 August 2013 they performed on TCS' Youth Festival in Indore city. In 2017 Kailasa rock the show at IIT Delhi on their Annual cultural extravaganza named 'Rendezvous'. They also performed in the Alva's Virasat in Moodbidri on 14 January 2018.

Discography
 Aawargi (2005)
 Kailasa (2006)
 Jhoomo Re (2007)
 Chaandan Mein (2009)
 Rangeele (2012)
 Ishq Anokha (2016)

See also
 Avial – Previous band of bass player Naresh Kamath

References

Indian musical groups
Musical groups established in 2005